Paremballonura (false sheath-tailed bat) is a genus of bats belonging to the family Emballonuridae.

The species of this genus are found in Madagascar.

Species
Species:

Paremballonura atrata 
Paremballonura tiavato

References

Emballonuridae
Bat genera